The 1992 Omloop Het Volk was the 46th edition of the Omloop Het Volk cycle race and was held on 29 February 1992. The race started and finished in Ghent. The race was won by Johan Capiot.

General classification

References

1992
Omloop Het Nieuwsblad
Omloop Het Nieuwsblad
February 1992 sports events in Europe